Ruacana is a town in Omusati Region, northern Namibia and the district capital of the Ruacana electoral constituency. It is located on the border with Angola on the river Kunene. The town is known for the picturesque Ruacana Falls nearby, and for the Ruacana Power Station.

The  farm Etunda is situated near Ruacana. It is run as a government supported irrigation scheme and has been established in 1993. Half of the farm is commercial irrigation land, the other half is allocated to 82 small-scale farmers. Etunda cultivates maize, wheat, watermelons, bananas, and other produce.

History
Ruacana was developed around the Ruacana Hydroelectric Power Station, a major underground hydroelectric plant linked to the nearby dam across the border in Angola at Calueque. The dam and pumping station were bombed in a Cuban airstrike in 1988, during the Angolan Civil War. The facility was partially repaired and today NamPower operates three turbines producing a maximum of 240 megawatts.

Ovazemba and Ovahimba people are native to the area. The name Ruacana originated from one of the first settlers in Ruacana called Ruhakana. The town was therefore named after a Mr Ruhakana, although it is currently written as "Ruacana".

Politics
Ruacana's settlement status was upgraded to village in 2005, and to town in 2010. It is now governed by a town council that has seven seats. The 2015 local authority election was won by SWAPO which gained six seats and 826 votes. The remaining seat went to the National Unity Democratic Organisation (NUDO) which gained 53 votes.

SWAPO also won the 2020 local authority election. It obtained 603 votes and gained five seats. The Independent Patriots for Change (IPC), an opposition party formed in August 2020, obtained 192 votes and gained the remaining two seats.

Education 
Ruacana Vocitional High School is located in Ruacana. There are several other primary schools and secondary school such as  Ombuumbu Secondary School, Tjihozu Primary School.

References

External links
Ruacana Hydro's technical specs at Namibia Power's website

Towns in Namibia
Populated places in the Omusati Region
Angola–Namibia border crossings